Devaux is a French surname that may refer to
André Devaux (1894–1981), French sprint runner
Antoine Devaux (born 1985), French association football defender
François-Antoine Devaux (1712–1796), French poet
Jean-Christophe Devaux (born 1975 ), French association football player
Henri Devaux (1862–1956), French biophysicist
Marianne Devaux (born 1962), New Caledonian politician
Paul Devaux (1801–1880), Belgian politician
Philippe Devaux (1902–1979), Belgian philosopher
Pierre Devaux (1897–1994), Belgian Olympic runner
Thierry Devaux (born 1959), French sportsman, developer of acrobatic bungee jumping

See also
Deveaux